The Combat Logistics Regiment 35 (CLR-35) was a logistics unit of the United States Marine Corps that was headquartered at Camp Kinser, Okinawa, Japan.  When active, the unit fell under the 3rd Marine Logistics Group (3rd MLG) and the III Marine Expeditionary Force (III MEF). The unit was formerly known as 3rd Materiel Readiness Battalion but officially changed its designation on October 20, 2006.

Subordinate units
 3rd Supply Battalion
 3rd Maintenance Battalion
 Combat Logistics Company 36

Mission
Provides integrated intermediate supply and maintenance support to III Marine Expeditionary Force including isolated components in garrison and when deployed as a MEF or as a part of a MAGTF in expeditionary conditions.

History
As part of the on-going reorganization of the Marine Corps, the regiment was decommissioned in May 2020.

Unit awards 
A unit citation or commendation is an award bestowed upon an organization for the action cited. Members of the unit who participated in said actions are allowed to wear on their uniforms the awarded unit citation. CLR-35 was presented with the following awards:

See also

 List of United States Marine Corps regiments
 Organization of the United States Marine Corps

Citations

External links
 CLR-35's official website

Combat logistics regiments of the United States Marine Corps
Military logistics of the United States